Sam Woods is a New Zealand-born British civil servant. In July 2016, he became the deputy governor of the Bank of England, and head of the Prudential Regulation Authority (PRA), which oversees the UK banking and insurance sectors. As head of the PRA, he succeeded Andrew Bailey, who became the head of the Financial Conduct Authority (FCA). Prior to his role at the Bank, Woods held positions at HM Treasury, UK Financial Investments, the Independent Commission on Banking, and earlier at Diageo and McKinsey.

References

British civil servants
Living people
People associated with the Bank of England
Year of birth missing (living people)
Deputy Governors of the Bank of England
Civil servants in HM Treasury